The Champaign Swarm are a professional minor league basketball team that plays in the Midwest Professional Basketball Association (MPBA). Based in Champaign, Illinois, the Swarm play their home games at Parkland College.

History 
Champaign won the inaugural MPBA championship defeating Bloomington Flex in a semifinal before a victory over St. Louis RiverSharks in the final 115-106. Avery Smith, who played three seasons at the University of Wisconsin-Milwaukee. The Swarm were coached in 2015 by Chris Daleo.

Season-by-season

References

External links
Champaign Swarm website

2014 establishments in Illinois
Basketball teams established in 2014
Basketball teams in Illinois
Champaign, Illinois
Sports teams in Champaign–Urbana, Illinois